The 1968–69 Notre Dame Fighting Irish men's basketball team represented University of Notre Dame during the 1968–69 NCAA University Division men's basketball season.

Schedule

References 

Notre Dame Fighting Irish
Notre Dame Fighting Irish
Notre Dame
Notre Dame Fighting Irish men's basketball seasons
Notre Dame